Statistics of UAE Football League for the 2005–06 season.

Overview
It was contested by 12 teams, and Al-Ahli Football Club - Dubai won the championship.

League standings

References
United Arab Emirates - List of final tables (RSSSF)

UAE Pro League seasons
United
1